Michele D'Ausilio (born 3 March 1999) is an Italian professional footballer who plays as a midfielder for  club Cerignola.

Club career
Born in Milan, D'Ausilio started his senior career in Eccellenza club Busto 81 and Serie D club Arconatese.

On 22 September 2020, he joined to Serie C club Giana Erminio. Made his professional debut on 26 September against Lecco.

References

External links
 
 

1999 births
Living people
Footballers from Milan
Italian footballers
Association football midfielders
Serie C players
Serie D players
Eccellenza players
A.S. Giana Erminio players
S.S.D. Audace Cerignola players